Revaz Jintchvelashvili (born  August 18, 1995), also known as Rezi Jintchvelashvili is a Georgian rugby union player. His position is fly-half and he currently plays for AIA Kutaisi in the Didi 10 and for the Georgia national team.

Career
Jintchvelashvili made his international debut in June 2013 against the South Africa President's XV at age 17, making him the second youngest player ever to play for Georgia. Over 2014–2015 he became the all-time leading points scorer of the World Rugby Under 20 Trophy, including 19 points in the final of the 2015 tournament to help Georgia win promotion to the World Rugby Under 20 Championship.

References

http://site.rugby.ge/en/2016-REC-GER-FF/ 
http://site.rugby.ge/en/2016-REC-GER-TM/
http://site.rugby.ge/ka-GE/2015-16-B10-aia/
http://site.rugby.ge/ka-GE/Aia-2015-16/

1995 births
Living people
Expatriate rugby union players from Georgia (country)
Rugby union players from Georgia (country)
Georgia international rugby union players
Rugby union fly-halves